Irene Anatolyevna Nelson (born Tereshina, ; 19 April 1972) is a Russian pop-rock recording artist, songwriter and producer. She was successful in the 1990s under the pseudonym Diana. She moved to Germany and in 2000, created Reflex which achieved success in the CIS.  During her participation in the band, she won three Golden Gramophone Awards.

In 2010, her first English single, "Sunrise", found success on the dance chart reaching # 35 in Billboard's Hot Dance Club Play.

She was awarded the Medal of the Order "For Merit to the Fatherland" II class for merits in the development of culture, a great contribution to the preparation and conduct of important creative and humanitarian activities on 18 May 2017.

Discography

Albums
under the pseudonym Diana
 1993 –  I Want to Love
 1994 –  I’ll be back
 1996 –  Don't Tell
 1997 –  Burn, it's Clear!
 1998 –  Then Piss Off
 1998 –  Do Not Kiss Her
 1998 – The Best
 1999 –  Make a Step

with REFLEX
 2001 – Meet the New Day
 2002 – Go Crazy
 2002 – I Will Always Wait for You
 2002 – This is Love
 2003 – Non Stop
 2005 – Lyrics. I Love.
 2005 – Pulse
 2006 – Harem (Lounge feat. Chillout remixes)
 2014 – Memories
 2015 – Adult Girls
 2019 – Harem 2 (Lounge feat. Chillout remixes)

solo career
 2011 – Sunrise

English singles
 2010 – Sunrise 
 2011 – When Apples Fall to the Sky

References

External links

Living people
Russian rock singers
Russian pop singers
1962 births
Recipients of the Medal of the Order "For Merit to the Fatherland" II class
Russian record producers
21st-century Russian singers
21st-century Russian women singers
Russian women record producers